The XI Mediterranean Games, commonly known as the 1991 Mediterranean Games, were the 11th Mediterranean Games. The Games were held in Athens, Greece, from 28 June to 12 July 1991, where 2,762 athletes (2,176 men and 586 women) from 18 countries participated. There were a total of 214 medal events from 24 different sports.

Participating nations
The following is a list of nations that participated in the 1991 Mediterranean Games:

Sports
23 sports were contested at the 1991 Mediterranean Games.

Medal table

References

External links
 XI Mediterranean Games, video footage at the Hellenic National Audiovisual Archive
 Olympic Council of Serbia 1991 Mediterranean Games results
International Mediterranean Games Committee
Mediterranean Games Athletic results at gbrathletics website
 Athens (GRE) at CIJM web site

 
Mediterranean Games
Mediterranean Games
Mediterranean Games
Multi-sport events in Greece
Mediterranean Games
Mediterranean Games by year
20th century in Athens
June 1991 sports events in Europe
July 1991 sports events in Europe